The Weeping Willows are an Australian country music duo, formed in 2012 consisting of Andrew Wrigglesworth and Laura Coates. They have released three studio albums, The Weeping Willows (2012), Before Darkness Comes A-Callin (2016) and You Reap What You Sow (2022).

History
The Weeping Willows released their debut single "Hold On" in 2012. This was followed by their debut studio album, The Weeping Willows in December 2012.

Between 2017 and 2022, The Weeping Willows were nominated for 10x Country Music Awards of Australia, 4x Country Music Channel (CMC) awards, 2x Australian Folk Music Awards (AFMAs) and Country Live Act of the Year at the National Live Music Awards (NLMAs).

In March 2022, the duo released their studio album, You Reap What You Sow which was recorded, engineered and mixed by Ryan Freeland at Los Angeles' Stampede Origin Studio.

Members
 Andrew Wrigglesworth (guitar, ganjo, lead vocals) 
 Laura Coates (lead vocals)

Discography

Albums
{| class="wikitable plainrowheaders" style="text-align:center;"
|+List of studio albums, with release date and label shown
! rowspan="2"| Title
! rowspan="2"| Album details
! colspan="1"| Peak chart positions
|-
! scope="col" style="width:3em;font-size:90%;" | AUSCountry
|-
! scope="row"| Til the North Wind Blows
|
 Released: December 2012
 Label: The Weeping Willows
 Formats: CD, digital download, streaming
| -
|-
! scope="row"| Before Darkness Comes A-Callin'''
|
 Released: 8 April 2016
 Label: The Weeping Willows (TWWCD01)
 Formats: CD, digital download, streaming
| -
|-
! scope="row"| You Reap What You Sow|
 Released: 4 March 2022
 Label: Compass Brothers, Universal Music Australia (4546735)
 Formats: CD, digital download, streaming, LP
| 8
|}

Extended plays

Awards and nominations
CMA Awards
The Country Music Awards of Australia is an annual awards night held in January during the Tamworth Country Music Festival, celebrating recording excellence in the Australian country music industry. They commenced in 1973.

 
! 
|-
| rowspan="5"| 2017
| "The Girl, The Bottle, The Memory" (written by Nick Wolfe)
| Song of the Year
| 
| rowspan="5"|
|-
| The Weeping Willows
| New Talent of the Year
| 
|-
| The Weeping Willows
| Group or Duo of the Year
| 
|-
| Before Darkness Comes A-Callin'| Alternative Country Album of the Year
| 
|-
| "River of Gold"
| Bluegrass Recording of the Year
| 
|-
| 2019
| "The Roses Fall" (featuring Allan Caswell)
| Bluegrass Recording of the Year
| 
|
|-
| rowspan="2"| 2021
| "Prelude"
| Instrumental of the Year
| 
| rowspan="2"| 
|-
| "Wheels Won't Roll"
| Bluegrass Recording of the Year
| 
|-
| rowspan="2"| 2022 || "Southern Gothic" || Instrumental of the Year ||  || rowspan="2"| 
|-
| "Black Crow" || Bluegrass Recording of the Year||  
|-
| rowspan="4"| 2023
| The Weeping Willows
| Group or Duo of the year
| 
| rowspan="4"| 
|-
| You Reap What you Sow''
| Alternative Country Album of the Year
| 
|-
| "House of Sin"
| Bluegrass Recording of the Year
| 
|-
| "Lynchburg Until This Song Ends"
| Bluegrass Recording of the Year’
| 
|-

Music Victoria Awards
The Music Victoria Awards are an annual awards night celebrating Victorian music. They commenced in 2006.

! 
|-
| 2021
| The Weeping Willows
| Best Country Act
| 
| 
|-
| 2022
| The Weeping Willows
| Best Country Work
| 
| 
|-

National Live Music Awards
The National Live Music Awards (NLMAs) are a broad recognition of Australia's diverse live industry, celebrating the success of the Australian live scene. The awards commenced in 2016.

|-
| National Live Music Awards of 2019
| The Weeping Willows
| Live Country Act of the Year
| 
|-

References

Musical groups established in 2012
Australian country music groups
2012 establishments in Australia